Aladár Pege (8 October 1939 – 23 September 2006) was a jazz musician from Hungary.  He was well known for his work and was dubbed "the Paganini of double bass".

He was chosen as best soloist of Europe in 1970, performed at Carnegie Hall and worked with Herbie Hancock. 
This was quite rare during the communist era, when Hungarian (and other Eastern bloc countries') artists were seriously restricted in foreign travel. 
He spent his last decades teaching at the Franz Liszt Academy of Music in Budapest.

External links
Aladár Pege's Official site
Mp3s of Aladár Pege's music

1939 births
2006 deaths
Hungarian jazz musicians
Hungarian Romani people
Post-bop double-bassists
Romani musicians
20th-century double-bassists
Mingus Dynasty (band) members